Anthony Dafaa (born 26 June 1988) is a Kenyan footballer who played several seasons in the Veikkausliiga.

Clement has previously played for Bandari in the Kenyan Premier League and for two clubs in Swedish lower divisions. He capped once for Kenya national team in 2009.

Career statistics

Club

International

Statistics accurate as of match played 14 March 2009

References 

1988 births
Living people
Kenyan footballers
Kenya international footballers
Veikkausliiga players
Bandari F.C. (Kenya) players
Vaasan Palloseura players
IFK Mariehamn players
FF Jaro players
Association football midfielders
Kenyan expatriate footballers
Expatriate footballers in Sweden
Kenyan expatriate sportspeople in Sweden
Expatriate footballers in Finland
Kenyan expatriate sportspeople in Finland
Sportspeople from Mombasa